Beyond Standard is an album by Hiromi Uehara’s group, Hiromi’s Sonicbloom. Contrasted with her previous albums that featured mostly original compositions, this one is a collection of Jazz standards played in a fusion style.

Reception
Chris Jones of BBC stated "With her usual trio now bumped up by the presence of guitarist David Fiuczynski (in their 'Sonicbloom' format), Hiromi Uehara continues the work of her previous album, Time Control, but this time it's cover versions all the way. The precocious pianist is undeniably, stunningly talented and though her brand of flash ivory tickling is jaw-dropping to behold it's often a little hard to process in digital form."

Jeff Winbush of All About Jazz noted "This is not just a good album; it's a fun album. The absolute nuttiness, yet undeniable proficiency and technique on display on tracks like "I've Got Rhythm" and "Claire De Lune" serve as cheerful additions to Uehara's efforts on Beyond Standard. At some point in her career, Hiromi Uehara may mail it in and make a half-hearted or lousy record. But so far she's five-for-five in producing music that is unfailingly brilliant, innovative, radiant and clever. Hiromi's Sonicbloom is a shot of adrenalin for tired musical tastes." Hal Horowitz of AllMusic added "It's a classy, impressive set that displays Hiromi's obvious talents on keyboards, but also her commendable ability to integrate solos into the band format without losing the thread of the original song's structure. Co-billing her talented Sonicbloom musicians is well earned, since they are nearly as much a part of this album's success as its star".

Track listing 
 Intro: Softly, as in a Morning Sunrise (Hiromi Uehara) (0:28)      
 Softly, as in a Morning Sunrise (Sigmund Romberg) (7:29)
 Clair de Lune (Claude Debussy) (7:25)       
 Caravan (Duke Ellington / Juan Tizol) (8:49)  
 Ue Wo Muite Aruko (Hachidai Nakamura) (8:42) 
 My Favorite Things (Richard Rodgers) (7:48)     
 Led Boots (Max Middleton) (6:33)  
 XYG (H. Uehara) (6:32)     
 I've Got Rhythm (George Gershwin) (5:51)
 Return Of Kung Fu World Champion (Hiromi Uehara) (10:18) (Japanese Edition Bonus Track)

Personnel 
 Hiromi Uehara - Piano
 David Fiuczynski - Guitar
 Tony Grey - Bass
 Martin Valihora - Drums

References

External links
Official website

2008 albums
Hiromi Uehara albums